Nizamdin Ependi (born 23 April 1991) is a Chinese footballer who plays for China League One side Sichuan Jiuniu.

Club career
Nizamdin graduated with a degree in law at Xinjiang University before he signed his first professional contract at the age of 25 in 2016 after making a positive impression in a trial with China League One side Nei Mongol Zhongyou. On 12 March 2017, he made his senior debut in a 1–0 away defeat against Qingdao Jonoon. He scored his first senior goal on 12 April 2016 in a 1–0 away win over third-tier club Meixian Techand in the second round of 2016 Chinese FA Cup. Nizamdin scored his first league goal on 25 June 2016 in a 3–0 home win against Shenzhen. Nizamdin played two season for Nei Mongol Zhongyou, scoring four goals in 59 appearances.

Nizamdin transferred to Chinese Super League newcomer Beijing Renhe on 28 February 2018. On 10 March 2018, he made his debut for the club in a 2–1 away win against Tianjin Quanjian, coming on as a substitute for Cao Yongjing in the 84th minute.

On 24 March 2022, Nizamdin transferred to China League One club Sichuan Jiuniu.

Career statistics 
.

References

External links
 

1991 births
Living people
Chinese footballers
Footballers from Xinjiang
People from Kizilsu
Association football forwards
Uyghur sportspeople
Inner Mongolia Zhongyou F.C. players
Beijing Renhe F.C. players
Heilongjiang Ice City F.C. players
Sichuan Jiuniu F.C. players
Chinese Super League players
China League One players
Chinese people of Uyghur descent